An agricultural cooperative, also known as a farmers' co-op, is a cooperative in which farmers pool their resources in certain areas of activity.

A broad typology of agricultural cooperatives distinguishes between agricultural service cooperatives, which provide various services to their individually-farming members, and agricultural production cooperatives in which production resources (land, machinery) are pooled and members farm jointly. 

Examples of agricultural production cooperatives include collective farms in former socialist countries, the kibbutzim in Israel, collectively-governed community shared agriculture, Longo Maï co-operatives and Nicaraguan production co-operatives.

The default meaning of "agricultural cooperative" in English is usually an agricultural service cooperative, the numerically dominant form in the world. There are two primary types of agricultural service cooperatives: supply cooperatives and marketing cooperatives. Supply cooperatives supply their members with inputs for agricultural production, including seeds, fertilizers, fuel, and machinery services. Marketing cooperatives are established by farmers to undertake transportation, packaging, pricing, distribution, sales and promotion of farm products (both crop and livestock). Farmers also widely rely on credit cooperatives as a source of financing for both working capital and investments.

Purpose 

Cooperatives as a form of business organization are distinct from the more common investor-owned firms (IOFs). Both are organized as corporations, but IOFs pursue profit maximization objectives, whereas cooperatives strive to maximize the benefits they generate for their members (which usually involves zero-profit operation). Agricultural cooperatives are therefore created in situations where farmers cannot obtain essential services from IOFs (because the provision of these services is judged to be unprofitable by the IOFs), or when IOFs provide the services at disadvantageous terms to the farmers (i.e., the services are available, but the profit-motivated prices are too high for the farmers). The former situations are characterized in economic theory as market failure or missing services motive. The latter drive the creation of cooperatives as a competitive yardstick or as a means of allowing farmers to build countervailing market power to oppose the IOFs. The concept of competitive yardstick implies that farmers, faced with unsatisfactory performance by IOFs, may form a cooperative firm whose purpose is to force the IOFs, through competition, to improve their service to farmers.

A practical motivation for the creation of agricultural cooperatives is related to the ability of farmers to pool production and/or resources. In many situations within agriculture, it is simply too expensive for farmers to manufacture products or undertake a service.  Cooperatives provide a method for farmers to join in an 'association', through which a group of farmers can acquire a better outcome, typically financial, than by going alone.  This approach is aligned to the concept of economies of scale and can also be related as a form of economic synergy, where "two or more agents working together to produce a result not obtainable by any of the agents independently". While it may seem reasonable to conclude that larger the cooperative the better, this is not necessarily true. Cooperatives exist across a broad membership base, with some cooperatives having fewer than 20 members while others can have over 10,000.

While the economic benefits are a strong driver in forming cooperatives, it is not the sole consideration.  In fact, it is possible for the economic benefits from a cooperative to be replicated in other organisational forms, such as an IOF.  An important strength of a cooperative for the farmer is that they retain the governance of the association, thereby ensuring they have ultimate ownership and control.  This ensures that the profit reimbursement (either through the dividend payout or rebate) is shared only amongst the farmer members, rather than shareholders as in an IOF.

As agricultural production is often the main source of  employment and income in rural and impoverished areas, agricultural cooperatives play an instrumental role in socio-economic development, food security and poverty reduction. They provide smallholder farmers with access to natural and educational resources, tools, and otherwise inaccessible marketplaces.  Producer organisations can also empower smallholders to become more resilient; in other words, they build the capacity of farmers to prepare for and react to economic and environmental stressors and shocks in a way that limits vulnerability and promotes their sustainability. Research suggests that membership in a producer organisation is more highly correlated with farmer output or income than other standalone investments such as training, certification, or credit.

In agriculture, there are broadly three types of cooperatives: a machinery pool, a manufacturing/marketing cooperative, and a credit union.

 Machinery pool: A family farm may be too small to justify the purchase of expensive farm machinery, which may be only used irregularly, say only during harvest; instead local farmers may get together to form a machinery pool that purchases the necessary equipment for all the members to use.
 Manufacturing/marketing cooperative: A farm does not always have the means of transportation necessary for delivering its produce to the market, or else the small volume of its production may put it in an unfavorable negotiating position with respect to intermediaries and wholesalers; a cooperative will act as an integrator, collecting the output from members, sometimes undertaking manufacturing, and delivering it in large aggregated quantities downstream through the marketing channels.
 Credit Union:  Farmers, especially in developing countries, can be charged relatively high interest rates by commercial banks, or credit may not even be available for farmers to access. When providing loans, these banks are often mindful of high transaction costs on small loans, or may refuse credit altogether due to lack of collateral – something very acute in developing countries. To provide a source of credit, farmers can group together funds that can be loaned out to members. Alternatively, the credit union can raise loans at better rates from commercial banks due to the cooperative having a larger associative size than an individual farmer.  Often members of a credit union will provide mutual or peer-pressure guarantees for repayment of loans.  In some instances, manufacturing/marketing cooperatives may have credit unions as part of their broader business. Such an approach allows farmers to have a more direct access to critical farm inputs, such as seeds and implements.  The loans for these inputs are repaid when the farmer sends produce to the manufacturing/marketing cooperative.

Origins and history 

The first agricultural cooperatives were created in Europe in the seventeenth century in the Military Frontier, where the wives and children of the border guards lived together in organized agricultural cooperatives next to a funfair and a public bath.

The first civil agricultural cooperatives were created also in Europe in the second half of the nineteenth century. They spread later to North America and the other continents. They have become one of the tools of agricultural development in emerging countries.
Farmers also cooperated to form mutual farm insurance societies.

Also related are rural credit unions.
They were created in the same periods, with the initial purpose of offering farm loans.
Some became universal banks such as Crédit Agricole or Rabobank.

Supply cooperatives 

Agricultural supply cooperatives aggregate purchases, storage, and distribution of farm inputs for their members. By taking advantage of volume discounts and utilizing other economies of scale, supply cooperatives bring down the cost of the inputs that the members purchase from the cooperative compared with direct purchases from commercial suppliers. Supply cooperatives provide inputs required for agricultural production including seeds, fertilizers, chemicals, fuel, and farm machinery. Some supply cooperatives operate machinery pools that provide mechanical field services (e.g., plowing, harvesting) to their members.

Examples

Australia 
 Co-operative Bulk Handling Limited
 Westralian Farmers Co‐operative Limited

Canada 
 Farmers' Storehouse Company
 United Farmers of Alberta
 Farmers of North America

France 
 Agrial (Normandy)
 Terrena (Pays de la Loire)
 Vivescia

Israel 
 Granot central cooperative

Japan 
Japan Agricultural Cooperatives

Ukraine 

 Ukrainian cooperative movement

United States 
 Landisville Produce Co-op, established 1914
 Rockingham Cooperative, established in 1921
 MFA Incorporated
 Darigold
 Organic Valley
 National Council of Farmer Cooperatives
 Southern States Cooperative
 Farmers Cooperative Association, Inc.; Frederick, Maryland
 Ocean Spray (cooperative)
 Land O'Lakes
 Michigan Sugar
 Sunkist
 Wilco stores (Oregon)
 Grange Cooperative

Netherlands 
 Avebe
 Agrico
 Agrifirm

Marketing cooperatives 

Agricultural marketing cooperatives are cooperative businesses owned by farmers, to undertake transformation, packaging, distribution, and marketing of farm products (both crop and livestock.)

New Zealand 

New Zealand has a strong history of agricultural cooperatives, dating back to the late 19th century. The first was the small Otago Peninsula Co-operative Cheese Factory Co. Ltd, started in 1871 at Highcliff on the Otago Peninsula. With active support by the New Zealand government, and small cooperatives being suitable in isolated areas, cooperatives quickly began to dominate the industry. By 1905, dairy cooperatives were the main organisational structure in the industry. In the 1920s–'30s, there were around 500 co-operative dairy companies compared to less than 70 that were privately owned.

However, after World War II, with the advent of improved transportation, processing technologies and energy systems, a trend to merge dairy cooperatives occurred. By the late 1990s, there were two major cooperatives: the Waikato-based New Zealand Dairy Group and the Taranaki-based Kiwi Co-operative Dairies.  In 2001 these two cooperatives, together with the New Zealand Dairy Board, merged to form Fonterra. This mega-merger was supported by the New Zealand Government as part of broader dairy industry deregulation, which allowed other companies to directly export dairy products.  Two smaller cooperatives did not join Fonterra, preferring to remain independent – the Morrinsville-based Tatua Dairy Company and Westland Milk Products on the West Coast of the South Island.

The other main agricultural co-operatives in New Zealand are in the meat and fertiliser industries. The meat industry, which has struggled at times, has proposed various mergers similar to the creation of Fonterra; however, these have failed to gain the necessary member support.

Canada 

In Canada, the most important cooperatives of this kind were the wheat pools.  These farmer-owned cooperatives bought and transported grain throughout Western Canada.  They replaced the earlier privately and often foreign-owned grain buyers and came to dominate the market in the post-war period.  By the 1990s, most had demutualized (privatized), and several mergers occurred.  Now all the former wheat pools are part of the Viterra corporation.

Former wheat pools include:
 Alberta Wheat Pool
 Manitoba Pool Elevators
 Saskatchewan Wheat Pool
 United Grain Growers

Other agricultural marketing cooperatives in Canada include:
 Organic Meadow Cooperative (organic dairy)
 Gay Lea Foods Co-operative Limited (dairy)
 Agropur

Ecuador 

The Amazon region of Ecuador is known for producing world-renowned cacao beans. In the Napo region 850 Kichwa families have come together with help from American biologist, Judy Logback, to form an agricultural marketing cooperatives, Kallari Association. This cooperative has helped increase benefits for the families involved as well as to protect and defend their Kichwa culture and the Amazon rainforest.

India 

In India, there are networks of cooperatives at the local, regional, state and national levels that assist in agricultural marketing. The commodities that are mostly handled are food grains, jute, cotton, sugar, milk and nuts

Dairy farming based on the Anand Pattern, with a single marketing cooperative, is India's largest self-sustaining industry and its largest rural employment provider. Successful implementation of the Anand model has made India the world's largest milk producer. Here small, marginal farmers with a couple or so heads of milch cattle queue up twice daily to pour milk from their small containers into the village union collection points. The milk after processing at the district unions is then marketed by the state cooperative federation nationally under the Amul brand name, India's largest food brand. With the Anand pattern three-fourths of the price paid by the mainly urban consumers goes into the hands of millions of small dairy farmers, who are the owners of the brand and the cooperative. The cooperative hires professionals for their expertise and skills and uses hi-tech research labs and modern processing plants & transport cold-chains, to ensure quality of their produce and value-add to the milk.

Production of sugar from sugarcane mostly takes place at cooperative sugar cane mills owned by local farmers. The shareholders include all farmers, small and large, supplying sugarcane to the mill. Over the last sixty years, the local sugar mills have played a crucial part in encouraging rural political participation and as a stepping stone for aspiring politicians. This is particularly true in the state of Maharashtra where a large number of politicians belonging to the Congress party or NCP had ties to sugar cooperatives from their respective local areas.  Unfortunately, mismanagement and manipulation of the cooperative principles have made a number of these operations inefficient.

Israel 
 Tnuva Central Cooperative for the Marketing of Agricultural Produce in Israel Ltd.

Netherlands 

 Coöperatieve Nederlandse Bloembollencentrale (CNB)
 Coforta
 Royal Cosun
 ZON
 FloraHolland
 FrieslandCampina

Ukraine 

 Ukrainian cooperative movements

United States 

 American Legend Cooperative (mink fur) "Blackglama" brand
 Blue Diamond Growers (almonds)
 Cabot Creamery (dairy)
 Darigold
 Diamond of California (nuts), formerly a cooperative
 Dairylea Cooperative Inc. (Dairy), formerly Dairymen's League
 Dairy Farmers of America
 Edible Garden
 Florida's Natural Growers (citrus fruit)
 GreenStone Farm Credit Services [financial products and services]
 Humboldt Creamery (dairy), formerly a cooperative
 Land O'Lakes (dairy and farm supply)
 Maine’s Own Organic Milk Company (dairy)
 Michigan Milk Producers Association (dairy)
 Michigan Sugar Company (sugar beets)
 Ocean Spray (cranberries and citrus fruit)
 Organic Valley (organic milk, cheese, eggs, soy, butter, yogurt, snack items)
 Riceland Foods (rice, soybeans, corn and wheat)
 Snokist Growers (pears, apples, cherries)
 Sunkist Growers, Incorporated (citrus fruit)
 Sun-Maid (raisins)
 Sunsweet Growers Incorporated (dried fruit, especially prunes)
 Tillamook County Creamery Association (dairy)
 Lone Star Milk Producers (dairy)
 United Egg Producers
 Welch Foods Inc. (Welch's)

Mexico 

 Zapatista coffee cooperatives

Production cooperatives 

These are cooperative farms, jointly owned or managed by a cooperative society.

Cuba

See also 
 Winemaking cooperative

References

Further reading 
 McBride, Glynn (2014), Agricultural Cooperatives: Their Why and Their How
 Derr, Jascha (2013), The cooperative movement of Brazil and South Africa
 Zvi Galor

 
Cooperative
Agricultural production
 
Rural community development
Cooperative